Almog (lit. Coral)  is an Israeli settlement in the West Bank, near the northwestern shores of the Dead Sea, in the Jordan Rift Valley, organized as a kibbutz. It is under the jurisdiction of the Megilot Regional Council. The international community considers Israeli settlements in the West Bank illegal under international law, but the Israeli government disputes this.

History
According to ARIJ, in 1977 Israel confiscated   524 dunams of land from the Palestinian site of Nabi Musa in order to construct Almog.

Initially established as a Nahal settlement in 1977, Almog became a kibbutz in 1979. It was named after Yehuda Kopolevitz Almog, a Third Aliyah pioneer who founded the potash mining industry which developed into the Dead Sea Works in Sodom. In the 1930s, Almog was one of the founders of the nearby kibbutz Beit HaArava.

Economy
The kibbutz runs a guesthouse and spa. On the grounds of the kibbutz is a small museum displaying copies of the scrolls found in Qumran. The kibbutz grows a variety of experimental crops for export.

References

Kibbutzim
Populated places established in 1977
Kibbutz Movement
Nahal settlements
Non-religious Israeli settlements
1977 establishments in the Israeli Military Governorate
Israeli settlements in the West Bank